Taherabad (also Romanized as Ţāherābād; also known as Ḩoseynābād, Ḩoseynābād-e ‘Arab, Ḩoseynābād-e Ţāherābād, and Husainābād) is a village in, and the capital of, Taherabad Rural District of Bumehen District of Pardis County, Tehran province, Iran. At the 2006 National Census, its population was 289 in 78 households, when it was in Siyahrud Rural District of the Central District of Tehran County. The following census in 2011 counted 109 people in 37 households.

The latest census in 2016 showed a population of 320 people in 107 households, by which time the village was in Gol Khandan Rural District of Bumehen District in the newly established Pardis County. After the census, Karasht Rural District and the city of Pardis separated from Bumehen District to establish the Central District of Pardis County, with two rural districts and the city of Pardis as its capital. At the same time, Taherabad Rural District was formed after separating from Gol Khandan Rural District, with Taherabad as its capital.

References 

Pardis County

Populated places in Tehran Province

Populated places in Pardis County